James or Jim Ferry may refer to:

 James Ferry (priest), priest of the Anglican Church of Canada
 James Ferry (footballer), English footballer
 Jim Ferry (basketball) (born 1967), American college basketball coach